Marie-Claire Girod (1957), best known by her stage name Buzy, is a French singer.

Albums 
Insomnies 1981
Adrian 1983
I Love You Lulu 1985
Rebel 1989
Rêve éveillé 1993
Délits 1998
:fr:BorderloveBorderlove 2005
Au bon moment, au bon endroit 2010

Main singles 
 1981 : Dyslexique / Osmose (j’vais pas mourir)
 1981 : Engrenage / Sweet lullaby
 1983 : Adrian / Prologue
 1983 : Adrénaline / Bleu
 1986 : Body Physical / Je, I remember
 1986 : Body Physical (remix)
 1987 : Baby boum / Stop eject
 1988 : Baby boum (special remix club)
 1989 : Shepard
 1989 : Keep cool (version maxi)
 1990 : Sweet soul / Night and day
 1990 : Sweet soul (Goldfinger mix) / Sweet soul (Chelsea mix)
 1993 : Le ciel est rouge (maxi avec 3 versions remix)
 1994 : Génération
 1994 : Les années Lula
 1994 : La vie c’est comme un hôtel
 1998 : Up and down
 2000 : Délits
 2005 : Je suis un arbre
 2006 : Borderlove
 2006 : Comme des papillons (avec Daniel Darc)
 2010 : Au bon moment, au bon endroit
 2010 : Sous X

References

Living people
1957 births